Stéphane Stassin (born 8 October 1976) is a retired Belgian professional footballer who currently works as youth coach at Anderlecht.

Career
While at Anderlecht, Stassin won the domestic title and played in the UEFA cup.

In 2000, Stassin joined Borussia Mönchengladbach. In 2001, he won promotion to the Bundesliga where he played for two seasons. With his contract running out at the end of the 2002–03 season, he suffered a severe knee injury during a friendly on 26 May 2003.

References

External links
 

1976 births
Living people
Belgian footballers
Belgian expatriate footballers
R.S.C. Anderlecht players
Borussia Mönchengladbach players
Angers SCO players
Royale Union Saint-Gilloise players
Belgian Pro League players
Challenger Pro League players
Bundesliga players
Ligue 2 players
Expatriate footballers in Germany
Association football midfielders